CVAR and ConVar are abbreviations for Console Variable.  Depending on the context in which the term is found, it may also stand for Client Variable, or Configuration Variable.

This is a type of variable used in many computer games and computer 3D simulation engines that can be manipulated by a text based command line interface within the game or engine, often called a console. They commonly hold configuration parameters, but can be used for anything that may potentially be accessed and/or modified by the console.

The most common usage of CVARs is by server operators to customize their online game servers.

References

Video game development
Variable (computer science)